The Bienne is a  long river in the Jura and Ain departments of eastern France. Its source is near Prémanon, Jura. It passes through the towns Morez and Saint-Claude. It discharges into the reservoir Lac de Coiselet, which is drained by the Ain, near Dortan.

References

Rivers of France
Rivers of Auvergne-Rhône-Alpes
Rivers of Bourgogne-Franche-Comté
Rivers of Ain
Rivers of Jura (department)